Guiguinto, officially the Municipality of Guiguinto,  is a 1st class municipality in the province of Bulacan, Philippines. According to the 2020 census, it has a population of 113,415 people.

Guiguinto is one of the fast-growing municipalities. From a predominating agricultural economy, it gradually urbanized and developed, now part of the Metro Manila conurbation.

It is the birthplace of composer Constancio De Guzman, known for writing songs like "Maalaala Mo Kaya". It also houses the Immaculate Conception Seminary, a Diocesan Seminary of the Diocese of Malolos located in barangay Tabe. The appellation “Guiguinto” literally translates to “Gold” for the early conquistadores came and saw this town on a harvest season when it lushes in golden rice stalks against the sun.

History
Guiguinto began as a barrio of Bulakan, the former provincial capital of Bulacan. It is said that Spaniards set up an army post in the barrio to serve as a resting place for forces going to Northern Luzon. In those days, travel throughout Guiguinto was difficult and slow down to cross single file over a narrow bamboo bridge. Their Filipino guides would cry out, "Hinto" (stop). The Spaniards thought this was the name "Hihinto". The Spaniards substituted "Gui" (with hard "g") for the Tagalog "Hi". The place has since been called Guiguinto. On the other hand, old timers say that on moonlight nights, a golden bull emerges from the church and goes down to the nearby river to quench his thirst. It then returns to the church, ascends at the altar and disappears. The elders' aid that there are buried jars of gold in town, as indicated by the bull, and that is why the town was called Guiguinto. It became an encomienda in the 1591 but the ecclesiastical administration was under Bulakan Convent and it was established as a Town in 1641.

In 1800, an Augustinian friar erected a small chapel in what is now barrio Santa Rita. In 1873, roads were constructed in barrio Malis. The people barrios of Pritil, Tabe, and Cutcut even those days were mostly farmers. During Holy Week, villagers of barrio Tuktukan held contest for the hardest egg shells (chicken, duck or goose by knocking eggs together (Tuktukan)). The women tried to help each other in singing the "Panica".

Just before the outbreak of the revolution of 1896, the town people of Guiguinto were ordered to sleep in the town at night and to work in their fields only in the day. This was said to have been suggested by the town priest to the authorities because of rumors that many of the town people were joining the secret revolutionary society, the Katipunan. Guiguinto eventually contributed many soldiers to the 1896 revolution.

At the time of American occupation, the new colonizers reorganized the Province of Bulacan into 19 municipalities from the original 26. Under populated town were subordinated with the large one and the town of Guiguinto was integrated in the town of Bulakan for almost 11 years. In 1915, Guiguinto regain its township again with Antonio Figueroa as its municipal mayor of the modern period. The town's population was then about 4,000. The 1960 census placed Guiguinto's population at 10,629. Guiguinto is bounded on the east by the town of Balagtas, on the west by Malolos City, on the north by Plaridel, and on the south by Bulacan.

Geography

Barangays
Guiguinto is politically subdivided into 14 barangays:

Climate

Demographics

Economy

A quarter of its 2,512 hectares was converted into nurseries giving livelihood to 500 families of gardeners and landscapers. Mayor Isagani Pascual announced that the landscaping business in Guiguinto is now a ₱ 50 million industry. Jojo Sebastian, chair of the Guiguinto Garden City Cooperative stated that their garden stores sell ₱ 100,000 to ₱ 300,000 plants and contracts for garden and landscapes designs a month.

Halamanan Festival
Established in 1999 by Mayor Ambrosio Cruz, Jr., the Halamanan Festival has since become the brand of the Municipality of Guiguinto. It was conducted in gratitude and recognition Guiguinto's dear patron, St. Ildephonsus (San Ildefonso), who held every January 23. It is considered that grand Street Dancing Festival, the participation of dancers from the schools and villages of Guiguinto and be in different towns of Bulacan. They adorned the garments as flowers and more. Besides the celebration for the feast of San Ildefonso was also a means to further pitting and display capabilities and "galing" of Guiguinteño in various fields of horticulture as landscaping, PROPAGATION seedling, plant growing, flower cutting, arranging and interior decorating.

Attractions
San Ildefonso Parish Church
Santa Rita Parish Church
Guiguinto Gardens in Santa Cruz and Tabang
Garden City in Santa Cruz
Guiguinto Municipal Garden in Poblacion
C.M. Farm in Cut-Cut
Golden Shower in Tabe
Alcor Center in Tiaong
Hidden Mountain Rocks in Tiaong
Luntiang Paraiso in Tabang
Guiguinto Old Train Station
Camp Hotel and Resort in Pritil
Klir Waterpark Resort in Santarita
St. Agatha Hotel and Resort in SantaRita
Halamanan Festival

Gallery

References

External links

Guiguinto Bulacan
 [ Philippine Standard Geographic Code]
Philippine Census Information

Municipalities of Bulacan